The FIFA Futsal World Cup is an international futsal competition contested by the senior men's national teams of the member associations of FIFA, the sport's global governing body. Since the first edition that took place in 1989 in the Netherlands, the tournament has been held every four years since 1992 in the even year between two 11-a-side World Cups.

The current champions are Portugal, who won their first world title after beating the 2016 defending champions Argentina in the final of the 2021 tournament in Lithuania.

All events prior to 2008 were 16-team events. The first event featured 6 teams from Europe, 3 from South America, 2 from Africa, 2 from Asia, 2 from North and Central America and 1 from Oceania. Since 2012, it includes 24 teams split to a six group round-robin tournament with four teams in each group. The top two teams in each group, together with the 4 highest-ranked third-place finishers, advanced to a sixteen-team knockout stage.

Qualification
24 national teams appear in the final tournament. 23 countries, including the defending champion, have to qualify in the continental competitions of the six confederations. The host country automatically qualifies.

Results

{| class="wikitable sortable" style="font-size:95%; text-align:center; width:;"
|-
! rowspan=2 style= "width:;" | 
! rowspan=2 style= "width:;" | Year
! rowspan=2 style= "width:100px;" |Host
! colspan=3 | Final
! colspan=3 | Third place game
! rowspan=2 style= "width:;" | 
|-
! width= 100px| Champions
! width= |Score
! width= 100px| Runners-up
! width= 100px| Third place
! width= |Score
! width= 100px|Fourth place
|-
|1
| 1989
|align=left| 
|
|2–1
|
|
|3–2 
|
|16
|- 
|2
| 1992 
|align=left|
|
|4–1
|
|
|9–6
|
|16
|-
|3
| 1996 
|align=left|
|
|6–4
|
|
|3–2
|
|16
|- 
|4
| 2000 
|align=left|
|
|4–3
|
|
|4–2
|
|16
|-
|5
| 2004 
|align=left|
|
|2–1
|
|
|7–4
|
|16
|- 
|6
| 2008
|align=left|
|
|2–2 |
|
|2–1|
|20
|-
|7
| 2012
|align=left| 
||3–2 
|
|
|3–0|
|24
|- 
|8
| 2016
|align=left|
||5–4|
|
|2–2|
|24
|-
|9
| 2021 
|align=left|
||2–1|
|
|4–2|
|24
|- 
|10
|2024
|align=left|
|colspan=3|TBD
|colspan=3|TBD
|TBD
|}

Debut of national teams

Overall team records

In this ranking 3 points are awarded for a win, 1 for a draw and 0 for a loss. As per statistical convention in football, matches decided in extra time are counted as wins and losses, while matches decided by penalty shoot-outs are counted as draws. Teams are ranked by total points, then by goal difference, then by goals scored.

Medal table

Comprehensive team results by tournament

Legend — Champions — Runners-up — Third place — Fourth place'QF — Quarterfinals
R2 — Round 2 (1989–2008, second group stage, top 8; 2012–present: knockout round of 16)
R1 — Round 1
Q — Qualified for upcoming tournament
 — Hosts

 Results of host nations

 Results of defending champions

 Result by confederation 
AFC

CAF

CONCACAF

CONMEBOL

OFC

UEFA

Goal-scoring leaders
All-time

Individual tournament

Awards
Golden Ball
The Adidas Golden Ball award is awarded to the player who plays the most outstanding football during the tournament. It is selected by the media poll.

Golden Shoe
The adidas Golden Shoe is awarded to the top scorer of the tournament. If more than one players are equal by same goals, the players will be selected based by the most assists during the tournament.

Golden Glove
The Golden Glove Award is awarded to the best goalkeeper of the tournament.

Goal of the TournamentGoal of the Tournament is awarded to the best goal of the tournament.

FIFA Fair Play AwardFIFA Fair Play Award'' is given to the team who has the best fair play record during the tournament with the criteria set by FIFA Fair Play Committee.

FIFA Champions Badge

In 2012, FIFA extended the FIFA Champions Badge to the winners of the competition, where it was first won by Brazil.

Winning coaches

See also
AMF Futsal World Cup
Futsal Confederations Cup
Women's Futsal World Tournament
FIFA Women's Futsal World Cup

Notes

References

External links 

 
 FIFA Futsal World Cup Overview at the RSSSF 

 
International futsal competitions
Futsal, FIFA
Futsal
Recurring sporting events established in 1989
Quadrennial sporting events